Nur Jahan, born Mehr-un-Nissa (Persian: نورجهان, ;  – 18 December 1645) was the twentieth wife and chief consort of the Mughal emperor Jahangir.

More decisive and proactive than her husband, Nur Jahan is considered by certain historians to have been the real power behind the throne for more than a decade. Wielding a level of power and influence unprecedented for a Mughal empress, she was granted honours and privileges never enjoyed by any of her predecessors or successors, such as having coinage struck in her name. Her pre-eminence was in part made possible by her husband Jahangir's addiction to alcohol and opium and his frequent ill-health.

Birth and early life (1577–1594)

Nur Jahan was born as Mehr-un-Nissa (1577) in Kandahar, present-day Afghanistan, into a family of Persian nobility and was the second daughter and fourth child of the Persian aristocrat Mirza Ghiyas Beg and his wife Asmat Begum. Both of Nur Jahan's parents were descendants of illustrious families – Ghiyas Beg from Muhammad Sharif and Asmat Begum from the Aqa Mulla clan. Her paternal grandfather, Khwaja Muhammad Sharif, was first a wazir to Tatar Sultan the governor of Khurasan, and later was in the service of Shah Tahmasp, who made him the wazir of Isfahan, in recognition of his excellent service. For unknown reasons, Ghiyas Beg's family had suffered a reversal in fortunes in 1577 and soon found circumstances in their homeland intolerable. Hoping to improve his family's fortunes, Ghiyas Beg chose to relocate to India where the Emperor Akbar's court was said to be at the centre of the growing trade industry and cultural scene.

Halfway along their route the family was attacked by robbers who took from them their remaining meager possessions. Left with only two mules, Ghiyas Beg, his pregnant wife, and their two children (Muhammad Sharif, Asaf Khan) were forced to take turns riding on the backs of the animals for the remainder of their journey. When the family arrived in Kandahar, Asmat Begum gave birth to their second daughter. The family was so impoverished they feared they would be unable to take care of the newborn baby. Fortunately, the family was taken in by a caravan led by the merchant noble Malik Masud, who would later assist Ghiyas Beg in finding a position in the service of Emperor Akbar. Believing that the child had signaled a change in the family's fate, she was named Mehr-un-Nissa or ‘Sun among Women’. Her father Ghiyas Beg began his career in India, after being given a mansab of 300 in 1577. Thereafter he was appointed diwan (treasurer) for the province of Kabul. Due to his astute skills at conducting business, he quickly rose through the ranks of the high administrative officials. For his excellent work he was awarded the title of Itimad-ud-Daula or ‘Pillar of the State’ by the emperor.

As a result of his work and promotions, Ghiyas Beg was able to ensure that Mehr-un-Nissa (the future Nur Jahan) would have the best possible education. She became well-versed in Arabic and Persian languages, art, literature, music and dance. The poet and author Vidya Dhar Mahajan would later praise Nur Jahan as having a piercing intelligence, a volatile temper and sound common sense.

Marriage to Sher Afgan (1594–1607)
In 1594, when Nur Jahan was seventeen years old, she married her first husband Ali Quli Istajlu (also known as Sher Afgan Khan). Sher Afgan was an adventurous Persian who had been forced to flee his home in Persia after the demise of his first master Shah Ismail II. He later joined the Mughal army and served under the Emperors Akbar and Jahangir. As a reward for his loyal service, Akbar arranged Nur Jahan's marriage with Sher Afgan. Their only child together, a daughter, Mihr-un-Nissa Begum, popularly known as Ladli Begum, was born in 1605. While participating in a military campaign in Mewar under Prince Salim, Ali Quli Istajlu was bestowed the title of Sher Afgan or "Tiger Tosser". Sher Afgan's role in the rout of the Rana of Udaipur inspired this reward, but his exact actions were not recorded by contemporaries. A popular explanation is that Sher Afgan saved Salim from an angry tigress. The title has been sometimes misquoted in English history of the Mughals as 'Sher Afghan', which would have a different meaning.

In 1607, Sher Afgan was killed after it was rumoured he had refused to obey summons from the Governor of Bengal, took part in anti-state activities and attacked the governor when he came to escort Sher Afgan to court. Some have suspected Jahangir for arranging Sher Afgan's death because the latter was said to have fallen in love with Nur Jahan and had been denied the right to add her to his harem. The validity of this rumour is uncertain as Jahangir only married Nur Jahan in 1611, four years after she came to his court. Furthermore, contemporary accounts offer few details as to whether or not a love affair existed prior to 1611 and historians have questioned Jahangir's logic in bestowing honours upon Sher Afgan if he wished to see him removed from the picture. The tomb, still in existence at Purana/Puratan Chawk in Bardhaman in present-day West Bengal, says that there was a battle between Sher Afgan and Qutubuddin Koka, the then Mughal Subahdar of Bengal and the foster brother of Jahangir in Burdwan in 1610 AD in which both of them died and were buried there at the tomb of Pir Baharam Sakka (died in 1563). Sher Afgan Khan was probably the appointed faujdar in Burdwan. This contradicts the fact that Sher Afgan was murdered in the year 1607.

As Mughal Empress

Lady-in-waiting to Ruqaiya Sultan Begum (1607–1611)
After her husband Sher Afgan was killed in 1607, Nur Jahan and her daughter, Ladli Begum, were summoned to Agra by Jahangir for their protection and acted as lady-in-waiting to the Ruqaiya Sultan Begum, who had been one of the chief wives of the late Emperor Akbar. Given the precarious political connections of Sher Afgan before his death, his family would be in certain danger with him gone from those seeking to avenge Qutbuddin's murder. For her protection, then, Nur Jahan needed to be at the Mughal court in Agra, she was brought back in honour (presumably because of her father's position at court) was clear from her new post with Ruqaiya Sultan Begum. It was under Ruqaiya's care that Nur Jahan was able to spend time with her parents and occasionally visit the apartments where the emperor's women lived.

Nur Jahan served as lady-in-waiting to the Dowager Empress for four years. The relationship that grew between Nur Jahan and Ruqaiya appears to have been an extremely tender one. The Dutch merchant and travel writer Pieter van den Broecke, described their relationship in his Hindustan Chronicle, "This Begum [Ruqaiya] conceived a great affection for Mehr-un-Nissa [Nur Jahan]; she loved her more than others and always kept her in her company."

Marriage to Jahangir (1611–1627)

Nur Jahan and Jahangir have been the subject of much interest over the centuries and there are innumerable legends and stories about their relationship. Many stories allege an early affection between Nur Jahan and Emperor Jahangir before Nur Jahan's first marriage in 1594. One variation recounts that they were in love when Nur Jahan was seventeen years old, but their relationship was blocked by Emperor Akbar. However more modern scholarship has led to doubts about the existence of a prior relationship between Nur Jahan and Jahangir.

Jahangir's proposal and marriage
In 1611, Nur Jahan met Emperor Jahangir at the palace's meena bazaar during the spring festival of Nowruz which celebrated the coming of the new year, Jahangir proposed immediately and they were married on 25 May of the same year (Wednesday, 12th Rabi-ul-Awwal, 1020 AH/ 25 May 1611 AD). Nur Jahan was thirty-four years old at the time of her second marriage and she would be Jahangir's twentieth and last legal wife. According to some accounts they had two children, while others report the couple remained childless. Incomplete records and Jahangir's abundant number of children, obscure efforts to distinguish individual identities and maternity. This confusion is shown by later sources mistakenly identifying Nur Jahan as the mother of Shah Jahan. Jahangir's wife, Jagat Gosain, a Rajput princess, was, in reality, Shah Jahan's mother.

Jahangir gave her the title of Nur Mahal upon their marriage in 1611 and Nur Jahan five years later in 1616. Jahangir's affection and trust in Nur Jahan led to her wielding a great deal of power in affairs of state. Jahangir's addiction to opium and alcohol made it easier for Nur Jahan to exert her influence. His trust in her was so great that he gave her the highest symbol of power and determination of the decrees of the empire – his imperial seal, implying that her perusal and consent were necessary before any document or order received legal validity. So for many years, she wielded imperial power and was recognized as the real force behind the Mughal throne.

Jahangir entrusted her with Shah Jahan and Mumtaz Mahal's second son, Prince Shah Shuja, upon his birth in 1616. This new responsibility was given to her due to her high rank, political clout and Jahangir's affection for her. It was also an honour for the empress as Shuja was a special favourite of his grandfather.

Family advancements and consolidating power
After Sher Afgan's death, Nur Jahan's family was again found in a less than honourable or desired position. Her father was at that time, a diwan to an Amir-ul-Umra, decidedly not a very high post. In addition, both her father and one of her brothers were surrounded by scandal as the former was accused of embezzlement and the latter of treason. Her fortunes took a turn for the better when she married Jahangir. The Mughal state gave absolute power to the emperor, and those who exercised influence over the emperor gained immense influence and prestige. Nur Jahan was able to convince her husband to pardon her father and appoint him Prime Minister. To consolidate her position and power within the Empire, Nur Jahan placed various members of her family in high positions throughout the court and administrative offices. Her brother Asaf Khan was appointed grand Wazir (minister) to Jahangir.

Furthermore, to ensure her continued connections to the throne and the influence which she could obtain from it, Nur Jahan arranged for her daughter Ladli to marry Jahangir's youngest son, Shahryar. This wedding ensured that one way or another, the influence of Nur Jahan's family would extend over the Mughal Empire for at least another generation.

Administration of the Mughal Empire

Nur Jahan was fond of hunting and often went on hunting tours with her husband and was known for her boldness in hunting ferocious tigers. She is reported to have slain four tigers with six bullets during one hunt. According to Sir Syed Ahmad Khan this feat, inspired a poet to declaim a spontaneous couplet in her honor:

Nur Jahan's administrative skills proved invaluable during her regency as she defended the Empire's borders in her husband's absence and navigated family feuds, rebel uprisings, and a war of succession brought on by the failure of Jahangir to name an heir before he died on 28 October 1627.

In 1626, Emperor Jahangir was captured by rebels while on his way to Kashmir. The rebel leader Mahabat Khan had hoped to stage a coup against Jahangir. Riding into battle atop a war elephant, Nur Jahan intervened herself to get her husband released. She ordered the ministers to organize an attack on the enemy in order to rescue the Emperor; she would lead one of the units by administering commands from on top of a war elephant. During the battle Nur Jahan's mount was hit and the soldiers of the imperial army fell at her feet. Realizing her plan had failed Nur Jahan surrendered to Mahabat Khan and was placed in captivity with her husband. Unfortunately for the rebels, Mahabat Khan failed to recognize the creativity and intellect of Nur Jahan as she soon was able to organize an escape and raise an army right under his very nose. Shortly after being rescued, Jahangir died on 28 October 1627.

Quest for retention of Power
In 1620, Nur Jahan in order to secure her power in the Mughal court after the decline of her husband, Jahangir's health, offered the marriage proposal of her daughter to the charismatic Khusrau Mirza with the affirmation of bringing him back to power. He was the first choice of Nur Jahan for the marriage of her daughter, Ladli Begum as he was the favorite of common people who desperately wanted to see him on the throne and was highly backed by the revered people of the Mughal Court owing to his exceptional capabilities and talent. However, the Prince in an effort to uphold the fidelity to his chief wife refused the marriage proposal though his wife begged him to accept the proposal and subsequently, this proposal was passed onto Prince Khurram upon whose refusal it was finally passed to and accepted by Shahryar Mirza.

Tensions between Nur Jahan and Jahangir's third son, the crowned Prince Khurram and future Shah Jahan, had been uneasy from the start. Prince Khurram resented the influence Nur Jahan held over his father and was angered at having to play second fiddle to her favourite Shahryar, his half-brother and her son-in-law. When the Persians besieged Kandahar, Nur Jahan was at the helm of the affairs. She corresponded with Kösem Sultan, Valide Sultan and regent of the Ottoman Empire. Nur Jahan attempted, with the support of the Ottomans and the Uzbeks, to form a coalition against the Safavids. However, no significant progress was conducted. She ordered Prince Khurram to march for Kandahar, but he refused. As a result of Prince Khurram's refusal to obey Nur Jahan's orders, Kandahar was lost to the Persians after a forty-five-day siege. Prince Khurram feared that in his absence Nur Jahan would attempt to poison his father against him and convince Jahangir to name Shahryar the heir in his place. This fear brought Prince Khurram to rebel against his father rather than fight against the Persians. In 1622 Prince Khurram raised an army and marched against his father and Nur Jahan. The rebellion was quelled by Jahangir's forces and the prince was forced to surrender unconditionally. Although he was forgiven for his errors in 1626, tensions between Nur Jahan and her stepson would continue to grow underneath the surface.

Jahangir died on 28 October 1627. Jahangir's death sparked a war of succession between his remaining sons, Prince Khurram who was proclaimed as Shah Jahan by Jahangir and Prince Shahryar who was backed by Nur Jahan being her son-in-law. Jahangir's eldest son Khusrau had rebelled against the Emperor, was partially blinded as a result and was later killed by Prince Khurram during an uprising in Deccan. Jahangir's second son, Parviz, was weak and addicted to alcohol. Afraid that if Shah Jahan was made emperor she would lose her powers and influence in the court, Nur Jahan favored Shahryar who she believed could be manipulated much more easily. During the first half of the war it appeared as though Shahryar and Nur Jahan might turn out to be the victors; however, the two were hindered by Nur Jahan's brother, Asaf Khan. Asaf Khan, who was also the father of Mumtaz Mahal, sided with Shah Jahan. While Asaf Khan forced Nur Jahan into confinement, Shah Jahan defeated Shahryar's troops and ordered his execution. In 1628, Shah Jahan became the new Mughal emperor.

Later years and death (1628–1645)

Nur Jahan was put under house arrest by her brother on the orders of new Emperor Shah Jahan and spent the remainder of her life confined in Lahore with her young widowed daughter, Ladli Begum, and her granddaughter. The three of them lived a simple and austere life.

She was granted an annual amount of 2 lakhs rupees by Shah Jahan. During this period she oversaw the completion of her father's mausoleum in Agra, which she started in 1622 and is now known as Itmad- ud- daulah's tomb. The tomb served as the inspiration for the Taj Mahal, unarguably the zenith of Mughal architecture, the construction of which began in 1632 and which Nur Jahan must have heard about before she died. Nur Jahan died on 17 December 1645 at age 68. She is buried at her tomb in Shahdara Bagh in Lahore, which she had built herself. Upon her tomb is inscribed the epitaph "On the grave of this poor stranger, let there be neither lamp nor rose. Let neither butterfly’s wing burn nor nightingale sing". Her brother Asaf Khan's tomb is also located nearby. Her daughter, Ladli Begum was buried beside her in her mausoleum after her death.

Patron of the arts and architecture
According to the Dutch traveller Pelaert her patronage of architecture was extensive, as he notes, "She erects very expensive buildings in all directions- "sarais", or halting places for travellers and merchants, and pleasure gardens and palaces such that no one has seen before" (Pelsaert, pp 50). In 1620, Nur Jahan commissioned a large "sarai" in Jalandhar district twenty-five miles southeast of Sultanpur. It was such an important "sarai" that, according to Shujauddin, " 'Serai Noor Mahal' in local idiom meant some spacious and important edifice."

Tomb of Itimaaduddaula
Itimaaduddaula died in January 1622, and his tomb has been generally attributed to Nur Jahan. The tomb took six years to finish (1622-1628), and was built at an enormous cost. It was built in Itimadaduddaula's own garden, on the eastern bank of the Yamuna across from Agra. The building is square measuring sixty nine feet on each side, with four octagonal towers rising up one at each corner. The central Vault inside the tomb contain the cenotaphs of Itimadduddaula and his wife, Nur Jahan's mother Asmat Begum. The walls in the central chamber are decorated with paintings set in deep niches. According to Vincent Smith the pietra dura of Itimadadudddaula's tomb was one of the earliest true examples of the technique in India. Nur Jahan also built the Pattar Masjid at Srinagar, and her own tomb at Lahore.

Textiles 
According to legend, Nur Jahan is purported to have made contributions to almost every type of fine and practical art. In many cases the attributions can be traced back to Khafi Khan, who according to Ellison Banks Findly, "seems to have been in the business of re-creating Nur Jahan's talents and accomplishments beyond all realistic possibility." According to Findly, Nur Jahan is said to have contributed substantially by introducing a variety of new textiles, among them silver-threaded brocade (badla) and silver-threaded lace (kinari).

Nur Jahan was very creative and had a good fashion sense, and she is credited for many textile materials and dresses like nurmahali dress and fine cloths like Panchtoliya badla (silver-threaded brocade), kinari (silver-threaded lace), etc.

In popular culture
Literature 
Nur Jahan is the subject of Letitia Elizabeth Landon's short sketch  with an illustration by H. Meadows in Heath's Book of Beauty, 1837.
Nur Jahan is a prominent character in Alex Rutherford's novel The Tainted Throne which is the fourth book of the Empire of the Moghul series.
Novelist Indu Sundaresan has written three books revolving around the life of Nur Jahan. The Taj Mahal trilogy includes The Twentieth Wife (2002), The Feast of Roses (2003) and Shadow Princess (2010).
Harold Lamb's historical novel Nur Mahal (1935) is based on the life of Nur Jahan.
Nur Jahan's Daughter (2005) written by Tanushree Poddar, provides an insight into the life and journey of Nur Jahan from being a widow to the Empress and after, as seen from the perspective of her daughter.
Nur Jahan is a character in Ruchir Gupta's historical novel Mistress of the Throne (2014).
Nur Jahan is a major character in 1636: Mission to the Mughals, by Eric Flint and Griffin Barber, (2017) a volume of the Ring of Fire alternate history hypernovel.
Nur Jahan is a character in the novel Taj, a Story of Mughal India by Timeri Murari.

Films and Television
Patience Cooper essayed the role of the empress in the biographical drama film Nurjehan (1923) by J.J. Madan.
Jillo Bai portrayed Nur Jahan in the 1931 silent movie Noor Jahan.
Nur Jahan was portrayed by Naseem Banu in Sohrab Modi's film Pukar (1939).
Actress Noor portrayed Empress Nur Jahan in Nandlal Jaswantlal's film Anarkali (1953).
Mehrunnissa/Nur Jahan was portrayed by actress Veena in M. Sadiq's film Taj Mahal (1963).
Meena Kumari portrayed Noor Jahan / Meharunnisa in the 1967 movie Noor Jahan, a dream project of Sheikh Mukhtar, directed by M. Sadiq.
 Pooja Batra portrayed Empress Nur Jahan in the 2005 historical film Taj Mahal: An Eternal Love story.
Gauri Pradhan played the title role of Nur Jahan in the television series Noorjahan which aired on DD National during 2000–2001. 
Siyaasat (2015), a historical drama which aired on The EPIC Channel, depicted the love story of Nur Jahan and Jahangir. It was based on the novel The Twentieth Wife by Indu Sundaresan. Jannat Zubair Rahmani and Charu Shankar portrayed Mehrunnissa/Nur Jahan. 
Sauyma Setia portrayed the role of a young Mehrunnisa in ZEE5's web series Taj: Divided by Blood

See also
Achabal Gardens
Serai Nurmahal
Tomb of I'timād-ud-Daulah
Panchtoliya
Nurmahali Dress

References

Further reading
Islamic Republic News Agency, "Iran India relations span centuries marked by meaningful interactions". 2014. irna.ir
 Nur Jahan: Empress of Mughal India, by Ellison Banks Findly, Oxford University Press US. 2000. .excerpts online
 Chopra, R. M., "Eminent Poetesses of Persian", 2010, Iran Society, Kolkata.
 Sundaresan, I. (2002). The twentieth wife. New York: Pocket Books. 
 Sundaresan, I. (2002). Power behind the veil.
 Lal, R. (2018). Empress: The Astonishing Reign of Nur Jahan. New York: W W Norton. 
What'sHerName Podcast (2018). THE EMPRESS: Interview with Nur Jahan biographer Ruby Lal.

Lal, Ruby (2018). Empress: The Astonishing Reign of Nur Jahan. W. W. Norton.

External links

1570s births
1645 deaths
Wives of Jahangir
Indian queen consorts
People from Kandahar
Indian women in war
17th-century Indian Muslims
Indian people of Iranian descent
16th-century Indian women
16th-century Indian people
17th-century Indian women
16th-century Iranian women
Iranian emigrants to the Mughal Empire
Indian Shia Muslims
People from Lahore